Antje Harvey (born May 10, 1967 in Magdeburg, as Antje Misersky) is a former German cross-country skier and biathlete.

She began her career as cross country skier and was a member of the East German team that won the 4 × 5 km bronze medal at the 1985 FIS Nordic World Ski Championships in Seefeld.  When her father, Henner Misersky, who worked as a trainer of the East German team until 1985, refused to give steroid substances to his daughter and other team members, he was fired. Antje Misersky was then put under pressure and had to end her career in the GDR.

In 1989, she started biathlon. At the 1992 Winter Olympics in Albertville, she won the gold medal in 15 km individual and two silvers in the 7.5 km sprint and in the 3 × 7.5 km. At the 1994 Winter Olympics at Lillehammer she won another relay silver medal (4 × 7.5 km). Harvey also won two medals in the relay at the World Championships (1995: gold, 1991: bronze).

In the spring of 1993, she married American biathlete Ian Harvey whom she had met 15 months earlier at the Biathlon World Cup in Ruhpolding, Germany.  In 1995, she retired from competitive sports and moved to Utah where she lives with her daughters, Hazel (*1996) and Pearl (*2001). In 2000, she became an American citizen.

For her refusal to take part in the systematic doping in the GDR, Antje Harvey received the Heidi-Krieger-Medal in 1995, in Berlin. The Heidi-Krieger-Medal is a prize of the association Doping-Opfer-Hilfe from Germany.

Cross-country skiing results
All results are sourced from the International Ski Federation (FIS).

World Championships
 1 medal – (1 bronze)

World Cup

Season standings

Team podiums

 2 podiums 

Note:   Until the 1999 World Championships, World Championship races were included in the World Cup scoring system.

References

External links
 
 
 Nordic World Ski Championship results 

German female cross-country skiers
German female biathletes
1967 births
Living people
Biathletes at the 1992 Winter Olympics
Biathletes at the 1994 Winter Olympics
Olympic biathletes of Germany
Olympic gold medalists for Germany
Olympic silver medalists for Germany
Olympic medalists in biathlon
German emigrants to the United States
Biathlon World Championships medalists
FIS Nordic World Ski Championships medalists in cross-country skiing
Medalists at the 1992 Winter Olympics
Medalists at the 1994 Winter Olympics
Sportspeople from Magdeburg